Benevolent asylums, also known as destitute asylums  or infirmaries for the destitute, were institutions established throughout the colonies of Australia in the 19th century to house destitute men; deserted, vagrant or homeless women and their children; and orphans not able to support themselves.  Poor conditions in the sleeping quarters and harsh treatment in some of these institutions created unpleasant experiences for many of those who had to reside in such places. 

The colony of Victoria had nine benevolent asylums, of which three were attached to hospitals,  in 1857, with an annual cost to the colony (including some building costs) of £124,250.

By January 1860 there were 11 benevolent asylums in the colony of New South Wales, housing 1,282 inmates and with a total annual expenditure of £25,822.

Benevolent Asylums and Infirmaries in Australia
New South Wales
Benevolent Asylum (Hyde Park, Sydney)
Carcoar Hospital and Benevolent Asylum
Deniliquin Benevolent Asylum
Eden Benevolent Asylum
Goulburn Benevolent Asylum
Hawkesbury Benevolent Asylum, Windsor
Liverpool Benevolent Asylum
Newcastle Benevolent Society
Newington Benevolent Asylum
Parramatta Benevolent Asylum
Queanbeyan Hospital and Benevolent Asylum
Randwick Asylum for Destitute Children
Scone Benevolent Asylum and Hospital
Singleton and Patrick's Plains Benevolent Asylum
Sydney Infirmary and Dispensary, now Sydney Hospital
Victoria
Ararat Benevolent Asylum
Belfast (Port Fairy) Hospital and Benevolent Asylum
Ballarat Benevolent Asylum
Casterton Benevolent Asylum
Castlemaine Benevolent Asylum
Creswick Hospital and Benevolent Asylum
Daylesford Hospital and Benevolent Asylum
Eaglehawk Benevolent Asylum
Hamilton Hospital and Benevolent Asylum
Ovens Benevolent Asylum, Beechworth
Port Fairy Hospital and Benevolent Asylum
Sandhurst (Bendigo) Female Benevolent Asylum
Sandhurst (Bendigo) Male Benevolent Asylum
Melbourne Benevolent Asylum now Kingston Centre
Victorian Benevolent Hospital/Asylum, later known as Mount Royal (closed)
Geelong Infirmary and Benevolent Asylum
Bendigo Benevolent Asylum and Industrial School
Warrnambool Benevolent Asylum
South Australia
Adelaide Destitute Asylum
Home for Incurables
Queensland
Dunwich Benevolent Asylum

Several of the buildings of the Adelaide Destitute Asylum are now home to the SA Migration Museum, which opened on August 26, 2003.

References

External links
 Boots from the Adelaide Destitute Asylum
 history of Sydney Benevolent Asylum (now Sydney Hospital)
 The Manning History of South Australia - The Destitute Asylum
 George Negus Tonight - history - Transcripts - Annie Kelly
 Heritage Treasures of Adelaide - Destitute Asylum building
 Disability Information and Resource Centre, South Australia
 National Library of Australia - Destitute Asylum picture
 Migration Museum website

Poverty in Australia
Social security in Australia